Cristiano Marcello da Silva (born December 3, 1977) is a retired Brazilian mixed martial artist and former Chute Boxe BJJ head coach who formerly fought for the UFC. Cristiano competed in the Brazilian National Jiu-Jitsu Championship in 1998, 1999 and again in 2001. Marcello was also a competitor on The Ultimate Fighter: Live.

Mixed martial arts career

Pride Fighting Championships
Cristiano fought for PRIDE Fighting Championships at the PRIDE Bushido 12 in August 2006.

Marcello is widely known for a backstage altercation at PRIDE Shockwave 2005 in which Charles Bennett insulted the Chute Boxe Academy and Wanderlei Silva resulting in a fight between Marcello and Bennett, and Marcello put Bennett to sleep with a triangle choke before the fight was broken up.

In January 2009, Marcello left the Chute Boxe Academy in Curitiba to go full on with his own martial arts academy, CM System, which opened its doors in March 2009. Despite leaving Chute Boxe, Marcello is still considered a BJJ coach, and continues to train Chute Boxe fighters out of his own gym.

The Ultimate Fighter
In February 2012, it was revealed that Marcello was selected to be a participant on The Ultimate Fighter: Live.  In the opening round, Marcello defeated Jared Carlsten by submission to qualify as one of the 16 fighters to live in the TUF house.

Marcello was selected as Team Faber's second pick (fourth overall). In the second fight of the first round, Marcello was selected to fight Justin Lawrence, Team Cruz's first overall pick.  He was knocked out by Lawrence at 3:15 of the second round.

Ultimate Fighting Championship
Marcello fought fellow cast member Sam Sicilia on June 1, 2012 at The Ultimate Fighter 15 Finale. Marcello lost via second round KO due to a flurry of knees and punches.

Cristiano made his return against Reza Madadi on October 13, 2012 at UFC 153. He won the fight via a controversial split decision. The decision was controversial since most major MMA outlets scored the bout for Madadi.

Marcello took on UFC newcomer and World Victory Road veteran Kazuki Tokudome at UFC on Fuel TV 8 on March 2, 2013. He lost the fight via unanimous decision.

Marcello faced Joe Proctor on February 15, 2014 at UFC Fight Night 36. He lost the fight via unanimous decision and announced his retirement 2 months later to focus more on his gym and coaching, Marcello also plans to compete in the ADCC for the first time in his grappling career.

Return from retirement
On June 29, 2018 Marcello announced that he has returned to MMA and has signed a three-fight contract with Brave CF.

Championships and accomplishments
Nitrix Champion Fight
Nitrix Lightweight Championship (One time)

Mixed martial arts record

|-
| Loss
| align=center| 13–6
| Joe Proctor
| Decision (unanimous)
| UFC Fight Night: Machida vs. Mousasi
| 
| align=center| 3
| align=center| 5:00
| Jaraguá do Sul, Brazil
| 
|-
| Loss
| align=center| 13–5
| Kazuki Tokudome
| Decision (unanimous)
| UFC on Fuel TV: Silva vs. Stann
| 
| align=center| 3
| align=center| 5:00
| Saitama, Japan
| 
|-
| Win
| align=center| 13–4
| Reza Madadi
| Decision (split)
| UFC 153
| 
| align=center| 3
| align=center| 5:00
| Rio de Janeiro, Brazil
| 
|-
| Loss
| align=center| 12–4
| Sam Sicilia
| KO (knees and punches)
| The Ultimate Fighter 15 Finale
| 
| align=center| 2
| align=center| 2:53
| Las Vegas, Nevada, United States
| 
|-
| Win
| align=center| 12–3
| Oriol Gaset
| Decision (majority)	
| Nitrix Champion Fight 6
| 
| align=center| 5
| align=center| 5:00
| Brusque, Santa Catarina, Brazil
| 
|-
| Win
| align=center| 11–3
| Freddy Thole
| Submission (triangle choke)	
| Desert Force Championship 1
| 
| align=center| 1
| align=center| 4:01
| Amman, Jordan
| 
|-
| Win
| align=center| 10–3
| Guido Cannetti
| Submission (rear-naked choke)	
| Bitetti Combat 8: 100 Years of Corinthians
| 
| align=center| 1
| align=center| 1:52
| São Paulo, Brazil
| 
|-
| Loss
| align=center| 9–3
| Alejandro Solano Rodriguez
| TKO (punches)
| Bitetti Combat 7 
| 
| align=center| 2
| align=center| 2:58
| Rio de Janeiro, Brazil
| 
|-
| Win
| align=center| 9–2
| Emiliano Vatti
| Submission (armbar) 
| Bitetti Combat 6 
| 
| align=center| 1
| align=center| 1:05
| Brasília, Brazil
| 
|-
| Win
| align=center| 8–2
| Hector Munoz
| Submission (rear-naked choke)  
| Art of War 3
| 
| align=center| 1
| align=center| 4:58
| Dallas, Texas, United States
| 
|-
| Win
| align=center| 7–2
| Dave Kaplan
| Submission (triangle choke)
| Fury FC 2: Final Combat
| 
| align=center| 2
| align=center| 2:37
| São Paulo, Brazil
| 
|-
| Loss
| align=center| 6–2
| Mitsuhiro Ishida 
| Decision (unanimous)
| Pride - Bushido 12
| 
| align=center| 2
| align=center| 5:00
| Aichi Prefecture, Japan
| 
|-
| Win
| align=center| 6–1
| Do Hyung Kim
| TKO (doctor stoppage)
| MARS World Grand Prix
| 
| align=center| 1
| align=center| 1:20
| Seoul, South Korea
| 
|-
| Win
| align=center| 5–1
| Jaydson Costa
| Submission (triangle choke)
| Meca World Vale Tudo 7
| 
| align=center| 1
| align=center| 3:23
| Curitiba, Brazil
| 
|-
| Loss
| align=center| 4–1
| Luiz Azeredo
| TKO (knees)  	 
| Meca World Vale Tudo 6
| 
| align=center| 1
| align=center| 8:30
| Curitiba, Brazil
| 
|-
| Win
| align=center| 4–0
| Fernando Almeida
| Submission (rear-naked choke)
| Brazilian Freestyle Circuit 2
| 
| align=center| 2
| align=center| 5:00
| Amazonas, Brazil
| 
|-
| Win
| align=center| 3–0
| Ricardo Corumba
| Submission (armbar)
| Brazilian Freestyle Circuit 2
| 
| align=center| 1
| align=center| 4:05
| Amazonas, Brazil
| 
|-
| Win
| align=center| 2–0
| Ray Peres
| KO (stomps and punches)
| Brazilian Freestyle Circuit 1
| 
| align=center| 3
| align=center| 3:50
| Amazonas, Brazil
| 
|-
| Win
| align=center| 1–0
| Claudio de Souza
| Submission (triangle choke) 
| Brazilian Freestyle Circuit 1
| 
| align=center| 1
| align=center| 4:37
| Amazonas, Brazil
|

Mixed martial arts exhibition record

|-
| Loss
| align=center| 1–1
| Justin Lawrence
| KO (punch)
| The Ultimate Fighter: Live
| 
| align=center| 2
| align=center| 3:15
| Las Vegas, Nevada, United States
| 
|-
| Win
| align=center| 1–0
| Jared Carlsten
| Submission (rear-naked choke)
| The Ultimate Fighter: Live
| 
| align=center| 1
| align=center| 2:43
| Las Vegas, Nevada, United States
|

External links
 
 
 The Official Site of CM System 
 The Official Blog of CM System

References

Living people
Brazilian male mixed martial artists
Lightweight mixed martial artists
Mixed martial artists utilizing Muay Thai
Mixed martial artists utilizing Brazilian jiu-jitsu
Brazilian practitioners of Brazilian jiu-jitsu
Brazilian jiu-jitsu trainers
Mixed martial arts trainers
Brazilian Muay Thai practitioners
Sportspeople from Curitiba
Brazilian people of Italian descent
1977 births
Martial arts school founders
Pan American Games competitors for Brazil
People awarded a black belt in Brazilian jiu-jitsu
Ultimate Fighting Championship male fighters